Arukathu Patabendige Jagath Pushpakumara, commonly known as Jagath Pushpakumara, is a Sri Lankan politician and Member of Parliament.

Political career
In 1993, Pushpakumara started his political career as the Wellawaya Electoral Organizer for Sri Lanka Freedom Party (SLFP). Then he became a Date Central Committee Member from 2010 to the present. During that same time, he worked as the SLFP Deputy Secretary from February 2015 to 2018. Apart from them, he was an active member of several committees including; the Committee on Public Enterprises, Committee on Public Petitions and Ministerial Consultative Committee on Labour. In the second government under President Mahinda Rajapaksa, Pushpakumara was appointed as the Minister of Coconut Development.

On 28 December 2015, Pushpakumara arrived at the Presidential Commission of Inquiry Into Large-scale Corruption and Fraud. In 2016, he was investigated for allegedly using over Rs.5 million rupees of government money to buy land under his wife's name. That same year, his official residence in Wijerama Mawatha was damaged by an electrical fire. In 2020, he made a controversial statement at a public election rally that there was a conspiracy to assassinate him.

Pushpakumara contested the 2020 parliamentary election as a Sri Lanka Podujana Peramuna (SLPP) candidate in Monaragala District and was elected to the Parliament of Sri Lanka, finishing the fourth among the SLPP candidates. On 22 February 2022, he was appointed as the new Chairman of the Committee on Public Petitions for the Second Session of the Ninth Parliament. In May 2022, it is reported that SLFP representatives Nimal Siripala de Silva, Mahinda Amaraweera, Duminda Dissanayake, Jagath Pushpakumara and Lasantha Alagiyawanna have decided to go beyond the party decision and take over the ministries of the new government under Ranil Wickramasinghe.

References

Living people
1963 births
Members of the 10th Parliament of Sri Lanka
Members of the 12th Parliament of Sri Lanka
Members of the 13th Parliament of Sri Lanka
Members of the 14th Parliament of Sri Lanka
Members of the 16th Parliament of Sri Lanka
Government ministers of Sri Lanka
Sri Lanka Freedom Party politicians
United People's Freedom Alliance politicians